Toad were a Swiss hard rock band formed in Basel, Switzerland, in 1970. The band went through lineup changes, but the longest lasting and most consistent lineup was a trio of Vic Vergeat on lead guitar and vocals, and  ex-Brainticket members Werner Fröhlich on bass and vocals, and Cosimo Lampis on drums.

Their best known songs were covers of Jimi Hendrix's "Purple Haze" and the Beatles' "I Saw Her Standing There", along with originals "Usin' My Life" and "Stay!". Their first two albums were engineered by Martin Birch. Though the band was not commercially successful outside of their own country, they were a popular live act because of their ferocity, musicianship and stage antics, most notably when Vergeat played the guitar with his teeth. Their concerts were often compared to those of Jimi Hendrix.

History
Toad was formed in 1970 by guitarist Vittorio 'Vic' Vergeat, who was briefly in the British space rock group Hawkwind, and bassist Werner Fröhlich and drummer Cosimo Lampis, both of whom left European psychedelic rock band Brainticket after the recording of their first album, Cottonwoodhill. Toad began writing and recording material for an album in late 1970, and in 1971 released their self-titled album and the single "Stay!," which did fairly well and made a great deal of headway in the Swiss charts – a feat that no other hard rock band had accomplished. The album was mixed by the British producer Martin Birch (who also produced for Deep Purple, Iron Maiden and Black Sabbath). The album also features Benjamin "Beni" Jaeger on vocals, who would leave once the album was finished. As their first album was being released in 1971, Toad performed at the Montreux Jazz Festival and was recorded live by the Swiss Television, but the footage was lost and to date there seems to be no further copy.

In 1972, the band released Tomorrow Blue, which was in a more blues direction and without a lead vocalist (with Vergeat and Fröhlich     
taking over vocal duties). Like their first album, it was engineered by Birch. It included Helmut Lipsky on violin, who played prominently on the tracks "Blind Chapman's Tales", "Change In Time" and the single "Green Ham." Later the same year, the band recorded the album Open Fire: Live in Basel 1972, which included covers of Hendrix's "Red House" and the Band of Gypsys "Who Knows."

They waited until 1974 to release their third album, Dreams, which featured the popular single 'Purple Haze'. Their history after that is largely undocumented except for a live album recorded in Geneva during 1978 and a studio album released in the early 1990s with different versions of the band. The rest of the 1970s and 1980s were spent appearing on a few compilations, releasing live albums and performing while slowly fading into relative obscurity. Sometime between 1979 and 1988, bassist Fröhlich left the group and was replaced by Kelvin Bullen. After he too departed from the group in the early 1990s, he was replaced by André Buser, who would remain with the band until its end. In 1986, Toad made an appearance at the St. Gallen Open Air Festival in St. Gallen, Switzerland.

In 1993, Toad released the studio album, Stop This Crime. Following its release, drummer Lampis departed from the group and was replaced by Claudio Salsi, who remained until Toad broke up. Lampis went on to create a school in Sardinia. In 1994, Toad played a concert in Brienz, Switzerland, which provided the material for the live album, The Real Thing. In about 1995, Toad broke up, following which the album Hate To Hate was released. It contained the same tracks as Stop This Crime, but with a different cover and title.

Vergeat went on a solo career, releasing many albums over the years.  He then formed and toured with his own band, the Vic Vergeat Band.  He still records and plays live to this day, mostly in Europe. The other former members went on to other groups or retired from the music business.

The band never achieved great success outside of their own country, but were influential on the Swiss heavy metal movement during the 1980s, influencing Krokus and Celtic Frost. They saw renewed interest in the early 2000s among the European hard rock scene. Their albums have been re-released and remastered for new generation of listeners and a CD boxed set, packaged to look like miniature vinyl records was released.

Band members
Original members
 Benjamin "Beni" Jaeger – lead vocals
 Vittorio "Vic" Vergeat – guitars, backing vocals, keyboards, piano, mellotron
 Werner Fröhlich – bass, backing vocals, moog synthesizer
 Cosimo Lampis – drums, congas, percussion, backing vocals

Later members
 André Buser – bass
 Caesar Perrig – bass
 Kelvin Bullen – bass
 Claudio Salsi – drums

Discography
Studio albums
 1971 - Toad
 1972 - Tomorrow Blue
 1974 - Dreams
 1993 - Stop This Crime
 1995 - Hate to Hate
 2003 - B.U.F.O (Blues United Fighting Organization)
 2004 - Behind the Wheels

Live albums
 1973 - Open Fire: Live in Basel 1972
 1978 - Yearnin' Learnin': Live 1978 (recorded live in Geneva)
 1994 - The Real Thing (recorded live in Brienz)
 2005 - Live at St. Joseph (Basel) 22.04.1972 (copy from Live at St. Joseph)

Compilation albums
 1978 - The Best of Toad
 1979 - Tomorrow Blue
 1992 - Rarities
 1999 - Toad Trilogy
 2003 - Toad Box

Singles
 1971 - "Stay!" / "Animal's World"
 1971 - "I Saw Her Standing There" / "Green Ham"
 1972 - "Fly" / "No Need"
 1975 - "Purple Haze" / "Making You Feel Right"
 1977 - "Baby You" / "I'm Going"

Filmography
1971 - Montreux Jazz Festival (recorded live by Swiss Television)
1978 - Toad on the Road (directed by Paul Grau)
1986 - St. Gallen Open Air Festival
1994 - The Real Thing (recorded live in Brienz)

See also
 Rock music in Switzerland

References

Sources

  Toad Trilogy 3CD Set: Toad, Tomorrow Blue, Dreams-Akarma AK 083/3 liner notes

Musical groups established in 1971
Swiss hard rock musical groups
Swiss rock music groups